Fuel 2000 is an independent record label, formed in 1994 as part of the Fuel Label Group. One of the biggest independent record labels, it has amassed a catalog with over 20,000 master recordings. Since its inception, the company has released over 900 album titles, including reissues and offerings from Jethro Tull, Deep Purple, Julian Lennon, Creedence Clearwater Revisited, Ian Hunter, Edgar Winter, Jefferson Starship, The Smithereens, Berlin, Missing Persons, Culture Club, Sheena Easton, Asia, The Rembrandts, The Archies, The Zombies, Phil Seymour, Carla Olson and others.

The Fuel Label Group assets were acquired by IP Investment Fund 43 North in 2015.

See also
 List of record labels

External links
 Official site
 

American record labels
Reissue record labels
Companies based in Los Angeles